Scream & Whisper is Edwin McCain's sixth studio album, released on June 22, 2004 by DRT Entertainment, McCain's second label in as many years. The album was his first new release in three years, and was recorded at Sonica Studios, Atlanta, Georgia, and Dirtmachine Studios in Studio City, California.

Track listing
 "Coming Down" (McCain, Pete Riley) – 3:33
 "Shooting Stars" (Angie Aparo, McCain, Riley) – 3:37
 "Throw It All Away" (Malcolm Pardon, Riley, Fredrik Rinman) – 4:01
 "Say Anything" (McCain, Riley, Maia Sharp) – 3:43
 "Turning Around" (McCain) – 3:40
 "Couldn't Love You More" (Larry Chaney, McCain) – 4:18
 "Good Enough" (Tyrone Coleman, McCain) – 4:04
 "Farewell to Tinkerbell" (McCain) – 2:59
 "How Can You Say That to Me" (McCain, Riley) – 4:08
 "Day Will Never Come" (Riley) – 4:27
 "Save the Rain" (Paul O'Brien, Riley) – 3:38
 "White Crosses" (McCain) – 6:11
 "Wild at Heart" (McCain) – 2:58
 "Maggie May" (Bonus Track) (Martin Quittenton, Rod Stewart) – 5:05

Personnel
Musicians
Edwin McCain – guitar (acoustic), mandolin, vocals
Larry Chaney – guitar (acoustic), mandolin, guitar (electric)
Pete Riley – guitar (acoustic), mandolin, guitar (electric), vocals (background)
Craig Shields – clarinet (bass), keyboards, organ (hammond), saxophone, wind controller
Lee Hendricks – guitar (bass)
Dave Harrison – percussion, drums
Noel Golden – keyboards, producer, engineer, mixing
John Lancaster – piano, wurlitzer
Maia Sharp – vocals

Production
Mike Froedge – drum technician
George Marino – mastering
John Briglevich – engineer
Phillip Ducker – engineer
Branon Thames – assistant engineer
Christopher Wade Damerst – programming
Mark Dobson – programming

Additional
Bryce Alexender – photography
Angie Little – photography
Rodney Bursiel – cover photo
Shawn Grove – digital editing
Scott Johnson – art direction
Colin Miller – assistant

Charts

References

2004 albums
Edwin McCain albums
DRT Entertainment albums